Bembé is a headway voice/percussion album by Milton Cardona.  The album contains a recording by Kip Hanrahan of Eya Aranla performing a full Santería ceremony.

Critical Reception 
The New York Times described the album as "an album with the crisp detail of a pop studio recording."

Track listing

References

1986 albums
Jazz albums by American artists